The Netherlands was represented by Anneke Grönloh, with the song "Jij bent mijn leven", at the 1964 Eurovision Song Contest, which took place on 21 March in Copenhagen. Grönloh was selected internally by broadcaster NTS and the song was chosen at the national final on 24 February.

Before Eurovision

Nationaal Songfestival 1964
The national final was held at the Tivoli in Utrecht, hosted by Elles Berger. Only three songs were performed and voted on by juries in the eleven Dutch provinces.

At Eurovision 
On the night of the final Grönloh performed second in the running order, following Luxembourg and preceding Norway. Only an audio recording of Grönloh's performance survives, as it is believed that the video master of the 1964 contest was destroyed in a fire at the Danish TV archive in the 1970s and no other broadcaster had recorded the show or requested a copy. Voting was by each national jury awarding 5, 3 and 1 points to their top three songs, and at the close of voting "Jij bent mijn leven" had received 2 points (1 each from Denmark and the United Kingdom), placing the Netherlands joint 10th (with Belgium) of the 16 entries. The Dutch jury awarded its 5 points to runaway contest winners Italy.

The Dutch conductor at the contest was Dolf van der Linden.

Voting

External links 
 Dutch Preselection 1964

References 

1964
Countries in the Eurovision Song Contest 1964
Eurovision